Emmendingen – Lahr is an electoral constituency (German: Wahlkreis) represented in the Bundestag. It elects one member via first-past-the-post voting. Under the current constituency numbering system, it is designated as constituency 283. It is located in southwestern Baden-Württemberg, comprising the Emmendingen district and the southern part of the Ortenaukreis district.

Emmendingen – Lahr was created for the inaugural 1949 federal election. Since 2021, it has been represented by Yannick Bury of the Christian Democratic Union (CDU).

Geography
Emmendingen – Lahr is located in southwestern Baden-Württemberg. As of the 2021 federal election, it comprises the Emmendingen district and the municipalities of Ettenheim, Fischerbach, Friesenheim, Haslach im Kinzigtal, Hofstetten, Kappel-Grafenhausen, Kippenheim, Lahr/Schwarzwald, Mahlberg, Meißenheim, Mühlenbach, Ringsheim, Rust, Schuttertal, Schwanau, Seelbach, and Steinach from the Ortenaukreis district.

History
Emmendingen – Lahr was created in 1949, then known as Emmendingen. In the 1965 through 1976 elections, it was named Emmendingen – Wolfach. It acquired its current name in the 1980 election. In the 1949 election, it was Baden constituency 5 in the numbering system. In the 1953 through 1961 elections, it was number 187. In the 1965 through 1976 elections, it was number 191. In the 1980 through 1998 elections, it was number 187. In the 2002 and 2005 elections, it was number 284. Since the 2009 election, it has been number 283.

Originally, the constituency comprised the districts of Emmendingen, Wolfach, and Villingen. In the 1965 through 1976 elections, it comprised the Emmendingen and Wolfach districts. In the 1980 election, it acquired a configuration similar to its current borders, but including the municipalities of Gutach, Hausach, Hornberg, Oberwolfach, and Wolfach. It acquired its current borders in the 2002 election.

Members
The constituency has been held continuously by Christian Democratic Union (CDU) since its creation. It was first represented by Heinrich Höfler from 1949 to 1965, followed by Albert Burger from 1965 to 1983. Rainer Haungs was representative from 1983 to 1998. Peter Weiß was elected in 1998 and served until 2021. He was succeeded by Yannick Bury.

Election results

2021 election

2017 election

2013 election

2009 election

References

Federal electoral districts in Baden-Württemberg
1949 establishments in West Germany
Constituencies established in 1949
Emmendingen (district)
Ortenaukreis